V-Ray is a biased computer-generated imagery rendering software application developed by Bulgarian software company Chaos . V-Ray is a commercial plug-in for third-party 3D computer graphics software applications and is used for visualizations and computer graphics in industries such as media, entertainment, film and video game production, industrial design, product design and architecture.

Overview
V-Ray is a rendering engine that uses global illumination algorithms, including path tracing, photon mapping, irradiance maps and directly computed global illumination.

The desktop 3D applications that are supported by V-Ray are:
 Autodesk 3ds Max
 Autodesk Revit
 Cinema 4D
 Maya
 Modo
 Nuke
 Rhinoceros
 SketchUp
 Katana
 Unreal
Houdini
 Blender

Academic and stand-alone versions of V-Ray are also available.

Modo support will be discontinued at the end of 2021.

Studios using V-Ray

North America

United States
 Method Studios
 Digital Domain
 Blur Studio
 Zoic Studios
 Apple Inc.
 Hogarth Worldwide

Canada
 Method Studios
 Digital Domain
 Bardel Entertainment

Europe
PostOffice Amsterdam

Germany
 Pixomondo
 Scanline VFX

References

Further reading 
 Francesco Legrenzi, V-Ray - The Complete Guide, 2008
 Markus Kuhlo and Enrico Eggert, Architectural Rendering with 3ds Max and V-Ray: Photorealistic Visualization, Focal Press, 2010
 Ciro Sannino, Photography and Rendering with V-Ray, GC Edizioni, 2012
 Luca Deriu, V-Ray e Progettazione 3D, EPC Editore, 2013
 Ciro Sannino, Chiaroscuro with V-Ray, GC Edizioni, 2019

External links 

Chaos Group
V-Ray at rhino3d.com
A Closer Look At VRAY Architectural Review of V-Ray
VRay Material Downloads and Resource Library
VRAYforC4D - the website of V-Ray for Cinema4d, made by LAUBlab KG
Free Material Library

3D graphics software
Rendering systems
Global illumination software
3D rendering software for Linux
Proprietary commercial software for Linux